Kamari Wilson (born c. 2004) is an American football safety for the Florida Gators.

Wilson began his football career at Fort Pierce Westwood High School and then played at the IMG Academy in 2020 and 2021. He was rated No. 18 nationally and No. 1 at the safety position in ESPN's rankings of the top college football recruits in the Class of 2022. Heavily recruited by college football programs, he narrowed his final choices to Florida, Florida State, Georgia, LSU and Texas A&M. In December 2021, he committed to play for the Florida Gators.

Wilson was Florida's highest-rated recruit and enrolled early in January 2022.

References

Living people
Year of birth uncertain
American football defensive backs
Florida Gators football players
Year of birth missing (living people)